Pin Pon is a 2003 Sri Lankan Sinhala children's thriller film directed by Sudesh Wasantha Peiris and produced by Sunil T Fernando for Sunil T Films. It stars Ravindra Yasas and his son Kasun Chamara in lead roles along with many foreign artistes. Music composed by Somapala Ratnayake. It is the 999th Sri Lankan film in the Sinhala cinema.

Plot

Cast
 Ravindra Yasas as Francis
 Kasun Chamara as Udara
 Neetha Subhash Lale as Udara's mother
 Maneesha Begham
 Vijaya Kar as Sanjeewa
 Sakeer Hossain
 Piyathilaka Atapattu
 Sisira Kumaratunga
 Macaque as Pin Pon

References

2003 films
2000s Sinhala-language films